Bobby Cook may refer to:

Bobby Cook (basketball) (1923–2004), American basketball player
Bobby Cook (footballer) (1924–1997), English footballer
Bobby Lee Cook (1927–2021), American attorney

See also
Robert Cook (disambiguation)